Kaspars is a Latvian masculine given name. It is a cognate to the German name Kaspar and English name Casper and may refer to:
Kaspars Astašenko (born 1975), Latvian ice hockey player
Kaspars Bērziņš (born 1985), Latvian basketball player 
Kaspars Cipruss (born 1982), Latvian basketball player
Kaspars Daugaviņš (born 1988), Latvian ice hockey player
Kaspars Dubra (born 1990), Latvian football defender 
Kaspars Dumpis (born 1982), Latvian luger and Olympic competitor 
Kaspars Dumbris (born 1985), Latvian biathlete 
Kaspars Gerhards (1969), Latvian politician
Kaspars Gorkšs (born 1981), Latvian footballer
Kaspars Ikstens (born 1988), Latvian footballer 
Kaspars Kambala (born 1978), Latvian basketball player
Kaspars Liepiņš (born 1984), Latvian sidecarcross rider 
Kaspars Ozers (born 1968), Latvian cyclist 
Kaspars Petrovs (born 1978), Latvian convicted serial killer
Kaspars Saulietis (born 1987), Latvian ice hockey player
Kaspars Stupelis (born 1982), Latvian sidecarcross passenger
Kaspars Vecvagars (born 1993), Latvian basketball player 
Kaspars Znotiņš (born 1975), Latvian stage and film actor

Latvian masculine given names